Dreieich is a town in the Offenbach district in the  of Darmstadt in Hessen, Germany. With a population of more than 40,000 it is the district’s second largest town.

Geography

Location 
Dreieich lies in the Offenbach district. Its northernmost constituent community of Sprendlingen lies some 10 km north of Darmstadt. Between Dreieich-Götzenhain and Dietzenbach rises the river Bieber.

Neighbouring communities 
Dreieich borders in the north on the town of Neu-Isenburg, in the northeast on the district-free city of Offenbach, in the east on the towns of Heusenstamm, Dietzenbach and Rödermark, in the south on the community of Messel (Darmstadt-Dieburg) and the district-free city of Darmstadt and in the southwest on the town of Langen. To the west lies Frankfurt Airport.

Constituent communities 
The town of Dreieich came into being on 1 January 1977 in the framework of municipal restructuring in the Offenbach district, bringing together five communities which until then had been self-administering. At the time of the merger, their population figures were as follows:
 Sprendlingen	20.474
 Dreieichenhain 8.044
 Buchschlag 2.782
 Götzenhain 4.651
 Offenthal 5.142

Today, 43.542 people live in Dreieich (main residences, 31 December 2019), including all five communities. Inhabitants here come from 117 different nations (as of 30 July 2007).

In 1977, Dreieich hosted the 17th  state festival.

History 
The town’s name comes from a royal hunting forest – the  – which had its first documentary mention as early as the 9th century. It was a forest whose hunting rights were exclusively the Emperor’s. This forest stretched along the lower Main from Aschaffenburg to Rüsselsheim and from Vilbel to the Neunkircher Höhe (heights) in the Odenwald. The oaktrees in many communities’ coats of arms in this area point to this origin. In the middle of this royal hunting forest in the 11th century rose Dreieichenhain, when the Lords of Hagen built a tower castle in 1075.

Buchschlag 
The first mayor was Rudolf Bindung. In 1909, Buchschlag already had 343 inhabitants. By the time it was merged with the other communities in 1977, the population had risen to 2,984. Buchschlag has largely managed to keep its  character: many old Art Nouveau villas in the middle of the community are still preserved today and collectively are under heritage protection. The newer parts of Buchschlag likewise consist of fully detached houses. There are only scattered terraced houses and on the main street, Buchschlager Allee, a few blocks of flats.

Dreieichenhain 

In the 11th century, a tower castle (Burg Hayn) was built from which the Lords of Hagen, later Hagen-Münzenberg (1075–1255), administered the Imperial hunting forest of Dreieich. The settlement beside the castle was first mentioned as a town on 23 September 1256 ( in Latin, meaning 'citizens in Hagen'), allowing the town to celebrate 750 years of having town rights in 2006.

The Falkensteins, who inherited the land from the Hagen-Münzenberg family, died out in 1418, and the Counts of Isenburg managed in time to acquire the lordship over Dreieichenhain. In 1549, the Reformation was introduced into the town. In 1816, the Isenburg-Birstein  of Offenbach passed along with Dreieichenhain to Hesse. The placename Hain in der Dreieich was changed in 1840 to Dreieichenhain. In 1834 the town had 998 inhabitants, and at the time of the merger on 1 January 1977 about 8,000.

Götzenhain 

After the Falkenstein family had died out, Götzenhain found itself under the ownership of the County of Isenburg in 1418, and in the 16th century, the Reformation was introduced.

Count Johann Philipp of Isenburg-Birstein built the palatial castle Schloss Phillipseich in Götzenhain about 1715. The new estate was built as an archetypal Isenburg estate. Only in 1724 did Götzenhain become an independent parish.

The  railway was opened in 1905 with a railway station in Götzenhain. In 1834, the community had 705 inhabitants, and by 1977 this had grown to 4,696.

Offenthal 

In a Langen boundary description,  was mentioned about 834, making Offenthal the oldest settlement in the Dreieich area after Sprendlingen. The Counts of Isenburg owned Offenthal as of 1489. As an important building monument, the Gothic church of Offenthal has been preserved. It was endowed about 1400 and thereby belongs among the Offenbach district’s oldest churches. After the Reformation’s introduction in 1528, the parish became Lutheran. Beginning in 1596, attempts were made to introduce Calvinism. In 1816, Offenthal became Hessian. In 1834 the community had 441 inhabitants, and by 1977 this had grown to  5.142.

In the early 1990s arose the Borngarten and Tannenstumpf new development areas. The rural calm and the proximity to Frankfurt am Main saw to it that Offenthal grew quickly.

Offenthal has a particularly wide choice of different clubs. The biggest clubs are the SUSGO, the FCO, the TTCO and the Offenthal Volunteer Fire Brigade (535 members as of 31 December 2007).

Sprendlingen 
The Counts of Isenburg acquired in 1486 from the Falkenstein inheritance the lordship over Sprendlingen. In 1528 the Reformation was introduced and in 1816 Sprendlingen passed to Hesse. In 1834, Sprendlingen had 1,788 inhabitants, and by 1977 this had grown to 21,351.

Politics

Town council 

The municipal election held on 26 March 2006 yielded the following results:

The elections in 2016 showed the following results 
 SPD   = 13
 CDU   = 13
 Greens = 7
 FDP   = 4
 AfD   = 3
 FWG   = 3
 LEFT = 2
 Total = 45

Foreigners’ advisory council 
Dreieich has an  – a foreigners’ advisory council – made up of 15 persons representing various nationalities with people from Turkey, Serbia, Italy, and Russia. As with town council itself, there is a foreigners’ advisory council session, which takes place a fortnight before the town council session.

The current chairman is Tindaro Canciglia.

Mayor 
2006–2018: Dieter Zimmer (SPD)
2018–incumbent: Martin Burlon (independent)

Twin towns – sister cities

Dreieich is twinned with:
 Joinville, France
 Lansingerland, Netherlands
 Oisterwijk, Netherlands
 La Porte-du-Der, France
 Stafford, England, United Kingdom

Culture and sightseeing

Dreieichenhain is above all known for the  kermis at Whitsun, and it hosts a Christmas market, which thanks to Dreieichenhain’s lovely Old Town is famous countrywide. The  is Southern Hesse’s biggest kermis and yearly draws 80,000 visitors. The highlights are the fireworks on Saturday evening and the traditional  on the Monday.

The  is a castle ruin from the High Middle Ages. The oldest part of the castle complex – the dwelling tower – was built in Salian times. It is one of the few secular architectural witnesses to Salian times in Germany. Cultural events at the castle are the nationally known  (castle festival games) and the jazz festival .

Within the framework of the regional park initiative, a sculpture designed by the landscape architects Ipach and Dreisbusch was built north of Dreieichenhain and is part of the regional park route. The sculpture is built in two sections and is accessible on foot. It forms a sightline with the Taunus and Frankfurt’s skyline.

Buchschlag on Dreieich’s western outskirts has numerous buildings in the Art Nouveau style by such architects as Wilhelm Koban, Ludwig Bernoully and Alois Beck, which as a contiguous ensemble are under monumental protection.

These newer buildings also house a restaurant. Around the Neuhof, a golf course has been established.

Schloss Phillipseich, a palatial residence, lies between Götzenhain and Offenthal. It is closed to the public as it is privately owned.

The Evangelical churches in Offenthal and Sprendlingen stand out for their fortresslike character. The church in Götzenhain is a Baroque building that dates to 1776.

Economy and infrastructure

Transport

Local public transport 

Dreieich lies within the area covered by the Rhein-Main-Verkehrsverbund. The Dreieichbahn: Dieburg – Rödermark-Ober Roden – Dreieich-Offenthal – Dreieich-Götzenhain – Dreieich-Dreieichenhain – Dreieich-Weibelfeld – Dreieich-Sprendlingen – Dreieich-Buchschlag – Frankfurt Central Station runs hourly through the entire town every day. From Monday to Friday there are additional trains between Rödermark-Ober Roden and Neu-Isenburg resulting in a half-hourly service on the common section.

Furthermore, some buslines serve the town:
 Dreieich-Sprendlingen – Dreieich-Buchschlag – Frankfurt Airport Terminal 1 (OF-64)
 Dreieich-Buchschlag – Langener Waldsee – seasonal only from May to September if the weather forecast is showing at least 24 °C (OF-65)
 Dreieich-Sprendlingen – Neu Isenburg (OF-67)
 Langen – Dreieich-Sprendlingen – Neu-Isenburg – Offenbach Marktplatz (X83)
 Langen – Dreieich-Sprendlingen – Neu-Isenburg (OF-91)
 Dreieich-Offenthal – Dreieich-Sprendlingen – Neu-Isenburg (OF-92)
 Langen – Dreieich-Offenthal – Dietzenbach – Heusenstamm (OF-96)
 Langen – Dreieich – Dietzenbach – Rodgau – Seligenstadt (OF-99)
 Nightbus: Frankfurt – Neu-Isenburg – Dreieich-Sprendlingen – Langen – Darmstadt (N71) (Runs every night)
Updated: 2022 Timetable

Road transport 
The Bundesautobahn 661 with its Dreieich interchange affords a road link to Frankfurt am Main. Moreover, the L 3262 state road links Dreieich to the A 5 (Hattenbach–Basel) to the west. Also, Bundesstraße 486 runs through the constituent community of Offenthal and likewise runs to the A 5, by way of Langen.

There has been a lengthy dispute over the Sprendlingen south bypass, which is to become part of Landesstraße 3262. It is meant to relieve downtown Sprendlingen of traffic.

Through Sprendlingen runs the former Bundesstraße 3 – now part of Bundesautobahn 661 – which begins south of Hamburg (Buxtehude) and ends at the border with Switzerland near Basel (Weil-Otterbach). Furthermore, Bundesstraße 46 to Offenbach begins in Sprendlingen.

Established businesses 

Dreieich’s original focus lay in the field of textile manufacture and processing. In the last five or ten years, though, Dreieich has developed itself into a central agglomeration of the information technology service provision industry. Important businesses in that field established here are, among others:
 Oracle
 Hitachi Data Systems
 Pan Dacom Networking AG
 Pan Dacom Direkt GmbH
 Bell Micro

Furthermore, the town is a regional hub for all kinds of shopping. Besides branches of OBI, Kaufland (formerly Real from 2006 until 2022 and Walmart until 2006) and Mann Mobilia (furniture chain), the biggest BMW dealership outside Munich can be found here. It is the Frankfurt location.

Other important employers in Dreieich are:
 Volkswagen Zubehör GmbH (accessories, until autumn 2007 VOTEX GmbH), wholly owned daughter company of VW AG Wolfsburg
 Mattel
 Wrangler
 Biotest
 ADTECH AG
 ARROW Electronics (Spoerle)
 Pall
 Hasbro
 CWS-boco Deutschland GmbH

Hahn Air has its head office in Dreieich.

Education

Primary schools 
 Wingert-Schule in Dreieich-Offenthal
 Karl-Nahrgang-Schule in Dreieich-Götzenhain
 Ludwig-Erk-Schule in Dreieich-Dreieichenhain
 Grundschule am Hengstbach (formerly Schillerschule) in Dreieich-Sprendlingen
 Gerhardt-Hauptmann-Schule in Dreieich-Sprendlingen
 Erich-Kästner-Schule in Dreieich-Sprendlingen
 Selma-Lagerlöf-Schule in Dreieich-Buchschlag

Comprehensive schools 
 Weibelfeldschule in Dreieich-Dreieichenhain
 Heinrich-Heine-Schule in Dreieich-Sprendlingen

Gymnasien 
 Ricarda-Huch-Schule in Dreieich-Sprendlingen

Vocational schools 

 Max-Eyth-Schule in Dreieich-Sprendlingen (with mit Gymnasium upper level; currently being converted into a lifelong learning campus)

Special schools 
 Georg-Büchner-Schule in Dreieich-Sprendlingen

Other schools 
 Volkshochschule in Dreieich-Sprendlingen (folk high school)
 Musikschule der Stadt Dreieich
 Strothoff International School

Other infrastructure 
The town of Dreieich also has its own television transmitter, the Stadt-Fernsehen-Dreieich (SFD). This transmits from the Weibelfeldschule and can be received over the local cable television network. Dreieich’s town library maintains four branches in the centres of Sprendlingen, Dreieichenhain, Götzenhain and Offenthal.

Notable people 
  was born on 22 April 1805 in the Kreuzmühle – the mill then belonged to the Götzenhain municipal area. He laid the groundwork here in 1849 for his later building company, the worldwide company Philipp Holzmann AG
 Ludwig Erk (1807–1883), musical educator, folksong collector and researcher, spent his childhood (1813 to 1820) in Dreieichenhain in the timber-frame house at Schulgasse 4 (today Alte Schulgasse)
Henri Vieuxtemps (1820–1881), Belgian violinist and composer, was – when he lived with his family from 1855 to 1864 in Dreieichenhain – at the high point of his career as the "Travelling Violin Vituoso"
  (or Jean Ruhl) (1877–1957) was born in Götzenhain and was in the early 1930s a Member of the Reichstag
Horst Ludwig Störmer (born 1949), In 1998 he was awarded the Nobel Prize in Physics and in his youth lived in the constituent community of Sprendlingen

Further reading 
Alfred Kurt: Stadt und Kreis Offenbach in der Geschichte, 1998, Bintz-Verlag, 
Eberhard Morell & Peter Hörr: Dreieich – Bilder einer Stadt,1996, ImHayn Verl.,

References

External links 

 
 Town’s official webpage 
 Dreieich-Buchschlag

External links 

Offenbach (district)